Weyns's weaver (Ploceus weynsi) is a species of bird in the family Ploceidae.
It is found in Uganda and adjacent eastern Democratic Republic of the Congo and north-western Tanzania.

References

Weyns's weaver
Birds of East Africa
Weyns's weaver
Taxonomy articles created by Polbot